Sabrina Duchesne (born 17 April 2001) is a Canadian Paralympic swimmer who won a bronze medal in the Women's 34pts 4x100m relay event at the 2020 Summer Paralympics.

She competed at the 2016 Summer Paralympics, 2018 Pan Pacific Para Swimming Championships, and 2019 World Para Swimming Championships.

References

External links
 
 

Living people
2001 births
Canadian female backstroke swimmers
Canadian female butterfly swimmers
Canadian female freestyle swimmers
Canadian female medley swimmers
Paralympic swimmers of Canada
Paralympic bronze medalists for Canada
Swimmers at the 2016 Summer Paralympics
Swimmers at the 2020 Summer Paralympics
Medalists at the 2015 Parapan American Games
Medalists at the 2020 Summer Paralympics
S7-classified Paralympic swimmers
21st-century Canadian women